is the railway station in Kawashimo-cho, Sasebo City, Nagasaki Prefecture. It is operated by Matsuura Railway and is on the Nishi-Kyūshū Line.

Lines
Matsuura Railway
Nishi-Kyūshū Line

Adjacent stations

Station layout
The station is on a bank with a single side platform.

Environs

Kyushu Bunka Gakuen High School
Sasebo Jitsugyo High School
Sasebo city synthesis ground
JGSDF Ainoura garrison

History
1994-10-03 - Renamed to present name.

References
Nagasaki statistical yearbook (Nagasaki prefectural office statistics section,Japanese)

External links
Matsuura Railway (Japanese)

Railway stations in Japan opened in 1991
Railway stations in Nagasaki Prefecture
Sasebo